Jacob Sabua (born 25 August 1994) is a Papua New Guinean footballer who plays as a midfielder for Lae City FC. He made his debut for the national team on May 29, 2016 in their 1–1 draw at the 2016 OFC Nations Cup against the New Caledonia.

References

External links
 

Living people
1994 births
Papua New Guinean footballers
2016 OFC Nations Cup players
Association football midfielders
Papua New Guinea international footballers